Penicillium nepalense is a species of fungus in the genus Penicillium.

References

nepalense
Fungi described in 1983